Jondi & Spesh is an American, San Francisco-based dance music production and DJ duo, composed of J.D. Moyer (Jondi) and Stephen Kay (Spesh).

They have founded their own record label, Loöq Records, and are the hosts of Qoöl, a weekly progressive dance music "happy hour" in San Francisco.

Jondi & Spesh have contributed several songs to the DDR Ultramix and UNIVERSE series for the Xbox. Their "Super-Max-Me" mix of the popular DDR song "MAX 300" can be found on arcade versions.

Discography

Albums 
 1998 – Tubedrivers
 2000 – We are Connected
 2004 – The Answer

External links 
 
 Official site
 Spundae Records official page
 Loöq Records official site
 Qoöl official site

Culture of San Francisco
American DJs
American dance music groups
American record producers
Electronic music duos
Remixers
Electronic dance music DJs